Kristof Willerton (born 21 July 1993) is a British gymnast. He won gold in tumbling at the 2013 Trampoline World Championships, thereby becoming the first British man to win a world tumbling title. He was part of the British tumbling team that won gold at the 2017 Trampoline Gymnastics World Championships, and at the 2019 Trampoline Gymnastics World Championships He studied biochemistry at St Edmund Hall, Oxford.

References

1993 births
Living people
British male trampolinists
British acrobatic gymnasts
Male acrobatic gymnasts
Alumni of St Edmund Hall, Oxford
Medalists at the Trampoline Gymnastics World Championships
21st-century British people